Gegharkunik may refer to:

 Gegharkunik Province, Armenia
 Gegharkunik, Gegharkunik, a town
 Gegharkunik Lake, now Lake Sevan, Armenia